Ololygon alcatraz is a species of frog in the family Hylidae. It is endemic to Ilha dos Alcatrazes, an island off the coast of São Paulo state, Brazil. Common name Alcatraz snouted Treefrog has been coined for it.

Ololygon alcatraz occurs in primary and secondary forest as well as degraded forest. It completes its entire life cycle (including tadpoles) in bromeliads.

The range of this species is very small, and it is threatened by touristic activities and fire.

References

alcatraz
Amphibians of Brazil
Endemic fauna of Brazil
Amphibians described in 1973
Taxa named by Bertha Lutz
Taxonomy articles created by Polbot